Stránecká Zhoř is a municipality and village in Žďár nad Sázavou District in the Vysočina Region of the Czech Republic. It has about 600 inhabitants.

Administrative parts
Villages of Frankův Zhořec, Kochánov and Nová Zhoř are administrative parts of Stránecká Zhoř.

Gallery

References

Villages in Žďár nad Sázavou District